Moyes Islands is a group of small islands lying in the west part of Watt Bay,  southeast of Cape-Pigeon Rocks. Discovered by the Australasian Antarctic Expedition (1911–14) under Douglas Mawson, who named them for Morton H. Moyes who served as meteorologist with the expedition.

See also 
 List of Antarctic and sub-Antarctic islands

Islands of George V Land